Admetula garrardi is a species of sea snail, a marine gastropod mollusk in the family Cancellariidae, the nutmeg snails.

Description
The shell size varies between 10mm and 17mm.

Distribution
This species is distributed in the Persian Gulf, Indonesia and the Western Pacific.

References

 Petit, R.E. & Harasewych, M.G. (2005) Catalogue of the superfamily Cancellarioidea Forbes and Hanley, 1851 (Gastropoda: Prosobranchia)- 2nd edition. Zootaxa, 1102, 3–161. NIZT 682

External links

Cancellariidae
Gastropods described in 1974